Charles Bolton may refer to:
Charles Bolton (pathologist) (died 1947), British physician and pathologist
Charles Bolton (footballer) (1876–1954), Australian rules footballer
Charles Anselm Bolton (1905–1970), British Roman Catholic priest and writer
Charles B. Bolton (1909–1976), American dentist
Charles Francis Bolton (born 1932), Canadian physician and neurologist
Charles Thomas Bolton (1943–2021), American-Canadian astronomer
A pseudonym of Black Bart (outlaw)